My Schoolfriend is a 1960 German comedy drama film directed by Robert Siodmak and starring Heinz Rühmann, Loni von Friedl, and Hertha Feiler. It is based on the play Der Schulfreund by Johannes Mario Simmel.

The film's sets were designed by the art directors Gottfried Will and Rolf Zehetbauer. It was shot at the Bavaria Studios in Munich.

Cast

References

Bibliography

External links 

1960 films
1960 drama films
1960s German-language films
Films directed by Robert Siodmak
Films shot at Bavaria Studios
Gloria Film films
West German films
Films about psychiatry
Films about miscarriage of justice
Films about Nazi Germany
German films based on plays
1960s German films